Gudenakatti is a village in Dharwad district of Karnataka, India.

Demographics 
As of the 2011 Census of India there were 362 households in Gudenakatti and a total population of 1,909 consisting of 983 males and 926 females. There were 262 children ages 0-6.

References

Villages in Dharwad district